Elections to Three Rivers Council were held on 2 May 2002. One third of the council was up for election and the Liberal Democrat party stayed in overall control of the council.

After the election, the composition of the council was:
Liberal Democrat 26
Conservative 15
Labour 7

Election result

Ward results

References
2002 Three Rivers election result
Ward results

2002
2002 English local elections
2000s in Hertfordshire